Oscar Pezoa (born 2 May 1933) is an Argentine cyclist. He competed in the 4,000 metres team pursuit event at the 1952 Summer Olympics.

References

1933 births
Living people
Argentine male cyclists
Olympic cyclists of Argentina
Cyclists at the 1952 Summer Olympics
Pan American Games medalists in cycling
Pan American Games silver medalists for Argentina
Cyclists at the 1951 Pan American Games
Medalists at the 1951 Pan American Games